Chlorurus  is a genus of parrotfish from the Indian and Pacific Oceans.

Species
There are 18 species:

Chlorurus atrilunula (Randall & Bruce, 1983)
Chlorurus bleekeri (de Beaufort, 1940)
Chlorurus bowersi (Snyder, 1909)
Chlorurus capistratoides (Bleeker, 1847)
Chlorurus cyanescens (Valenciennes, 1840)
Chlorurus enneacanthus (Lacépède, 1802)
Chlorurus frontalis (Valenciennes, 1840)
Chlorurus genazonatus (Randall & Bruce, 1983)
Chlorurus gibbus (Rüppell, 1829)
Chlorurus japanensis (Bloch, 1789)
Chlorurus microrhinos (Bleeker, 1854)
Chlorurus oedema (Snyder, 1909)
Chlorurus perspicillatus (Steindachner, 1879)
Chlorurus rhakoura Randall & Anderson, 1997
Chlorurus sordidus (Forsskål, 1775)
Chlorurus spilurus (Valenciennes, 1840)
Chlorurus strongylocephalus (Bleeker, 1855)
Chlorurus troschelii (Bleeker, 1853)

Gallery

References

 
Scaridae
Marine fish genera
Taxa named by William John Swainson